Ioan Glogojanu (1 July 1888 – 22 October 1941) was a Romanian general of the 10th Infantry Division of the Romanian army during World War II. 

Glogojanu was one of the Romanian commanders during the Siege of Odessa. He became chief military administrator of Odessa on 22 October, but was killed by an explosion at his headquarters, set up by Soviet agents, only a month after the fall of the city. His death, and the death of 60 others in that explosion, served as the catalyst for the Odessa massacre.

References 

1888 births
1941 deaths
People from Râmnicu Sărat
Romanian Land Forces generals
Romanian military personnel of World War I
Romanian military personnel killed in World War II
Commanders of the Order of the Crown (Romania)
Recipients of the Order of Michael the Brave
Assassinated military personnel